Stampex is a twice yearly British stamp show held at the Business Design Centre (BDC) in Islington, London, every Spring and Autumn. The show is organised by the Philatelic Traders Society (PTS) through their company PTS Stamp and Coin Exhibitions Limited and has been running for many years.

Elements of the show
The show consists mainly of stands from stamp dealers who are members of the PTS but specialist philatelic societies often hold meetings in conjunction with the show.

Other important parts of the show include a youth area run by the Stamp Active Network, formerly the National Youth Stamp Group, and a large stand from Britain's Royal Mail where recent British stamp issues are on sale.

Souvenirs
Admission is free of charge and visitors usually receive a modest philatelic souvenir of some kind. At the Spring 2009 show a postcard was given featuring unadopted artwork by stamp designer Jeffery Matthews for a proposed 1979 Welsh Assembly stamp issue. These souvenirs have become collectable.

History
Stampex has not always been at the BDC. For many years it was located at the Central Hall, Westminster when it was organised between the PTS and The Junior Philatelic Society (now the National Philatelic Society).

The Jules Rimet trophy was stolen from Westminster Central Hall while exhibited as part of a "Sport with Stamps" display during Stampex in March 1966. Stamps worth an estimated £3m were left behind. The trophy was subsequently recovered.

Other British shows 
There is no other regular national show competing with Stampex in the UK, although many smaller shows take place and an FIP endorsed international show takes place in London every ten years, with the next being the London 2020 International Stamp Exhibition (delayed until 2022 due to the Covid-19 pandemic).

The name has been adopted for stamp shows in other countries, for instance Hong Kong Stampex and Adelaide Stampex, however, none are connected with the British version.

See also
List of philatelic exhibitions (by country)

References

External links
 

Philatelic events